Johan "Jan" Adolph Frederik Kok (July 9, 1889 in Soerabaja, Dutch East Indies – December 2, 1958 in Zeist) was a Dutch football (soccer) player who competed in the 1908 Summer Olympics as a member of the Dutch team, which won the bronze medal in the football tournament.

References

External links
profile

1889 births
1958 deaths
Dutch footballers
Footballers at the 1908 Summer Olympics
Olympic footballers of the Netherlands
Olympic bronze medalists for the Netherlands
Netherlands international footballers
Sportspeople from Surabaya
Olympic medalists in football
Medalists at the 1908 Summer Olympics
Association football midfielders
Dutch people of the Dutch East Indies